The Aero Industries TG-31 was a 1940s American military training glider, designed and built by students at the Aero Industries Technical Institute as the Aero Industries G-2 and impressed into military service as the Aero Industries TG-31 on 29 June 1942.

Design and development
The Aero Industries TG-31 design was a high-wing sailplane design of wood-steel-fabric construction, with a single wheel aft of the nose skid. One G-2 sailplane (civil registration NC19965) was impressed into USAAF service on June 29, 1942 and allocated the designation TG-31 and the serial number 42-57171.

Operators

United States Army Air Forces

Specifications

See also

References

Bibliography
 

1940s United States military trainer aircraft
Glider aircraft